The 2011 World Weightlifting Championships were held at Disneyland Paris in Paris, France. The event took place from November 5 to 13, 2011.

Medal summary

Men

Women

Medal table 

Ranking by Big (Total result) medals 

Ranking by all medals: Big (Total result) and Small (Snatch and Clean & Jerk)

Team ranking

Men

Women

Participating nations
519 competitors from 87 nations participated. Due to not submitting their whereabouts information according to the IWF Anti-Doping Policy Bulgaria, Cyprus, Saudi Arabia, Oman, Qatar, Sierra Leone and Sri Lanka were not allowed to participate in this year's edition.

 (10)
 (1)
 (10)
 (7)
 (10)
 (11)
 (1)
 (1)
 (9)
 (2)
 (14)
 (1)
 (15)
 (10)
 (10)
 (1)
 (2)
 (6)
 (2)
 (1)
 (4)
 (10)
 (10)
 (3)
 (1)
 (2)
 (7)
 (12)
 (6)
 (12)
 (8)
 (6)
 (2)
 (1)
 (7)
 (14)
 (10)
 (8)
 (2)
 (1)
 (8)
 (15)
 (14)
 (1)
 (2)
 (2)
 (6)
 (2)
 (3)
 (7)
 (9)
 (2)
 (2)
 (1)
 (8)
 (1)
 (11)
 (1)
 (1)
 (1)
 (1)
 (2)
 (2)
 (15)
 (2)
 (7)
 (15)
 (4)
 (1)
 (1)
 (7)
 (2)
 (11)
 (10)
 (4)
 (2)
 (1)
 (11)
 (4)
 (12)
 (8)
 (1)
 (13)
 (14)
 (8)
 (11)
 (3)

Aftermath
Ukrainian female weightlifter Olha Korobka failed a drugs test after the tournament and was disqualified from the bronze-medal position in the over 75 kg category.

References
General
2011 IWF World Championships Results Book 

Specific

External links
Official website

 
2011 in weightlifting
2011 in French sport
2011
International weightlifting competitions hosted by France
2011 in Paris
Disneyland Paris
November 2011 sports events in France